Charles William Smith (September 15, 1937 – November 29, 1994) was an American Major League Baseball third baseman.

Brooklyn Dodgers signee
Smith was one of the last players to sign with the Brooklyn Dodgers before their move to Los Angeles. Over four seasons in their farm system, Smith batted .293 with 73 home runs and 330 runs batted in. He debuted with the Los Angeles Dodgers as a September call up in 1960. Though he went hitless in his major league debut, he had two RBIs. In eighteen games, he was 10-for-60 with five RBIs.

He made his first major league start at short in the second game of an April 30 doubleheader with the Chicago Cubs, and committed a throwing error.

Philadelphia Phillies
Twenty games into the  season, the Dodgers traded Smith and outfielder Don Demeter to the Philadelphia Phillies for relief pitcher Turk Farrell and infielder Joe Koppe. Smith found himself in a three way battle (with Bob Sadowski & Jim Woods) for the starting third base job upon his arrival in Philadelphia, but he won the job by mid June. He batted .248 with nine home runs and 47 RBIs for a Phillies team that lost 107 games. During the off season, he and pitcher John Buzhardt were traded to the Chicago White Sox for slugging first baseman Roy Sievers.

Chicago White Sox
He appeared in 65 games, and batted .207 with two home runs and seventeen RBIs. The highlight of his White Sox career was a 3-for-4 performance against the Los Angeles Angels on June 5. Smith broke up a 1–1 tie in the third with an RBI single. After the Angels took a 5–3 lead, Smith tied the game with another single that drove in two. In the ninth, his third single of the day drove in the winning run.

On April 16, Smith struck out as a pinch hitter. After which, he was optioned down to the triple A Indianapolis Indians, where he would spend the remainder of the season. He received a September call up, and was 2-for-6 with an RBI triple in his return.

New York Mets
Two games into the  season, Smith was dealt to the New York Mets for shortstop Chico Fernández and minor league catcher Bobby Catton. With the Mets, Smith once again had a starting job with a team that would lose 100 games.

Though he went hitless in his first 25 at bats as a Met, Hall of Fame manager Casey Stengel stuck with Smith, and he soon emerged as the top slugger on the team. He went 3-for-6 with a home run and five RBIs and two runs scored in the Mets' 19-1 drubbing of the Cubs on May 26. On August 17, his two home runs drove in four of the Mets' five runs in their shutout of the Pittsburgh Pirates.

All told, his twenty home runs were a career best, and also led the team. His 58 RBIs were second to Joe Christopher's 76. He committed 31 errors, 23 of which at third, giving him a .917 fielding percentage at his primary position.

The 1965 Mets were 50-112, the second worst record in franchise history. He batted .160 with four RBIs in April. His first home run on May 14 off the Cincinnati Reds' Joe Nuxhall was a game winner. His next two home runs also came against Cincinnati, one in each game of a May 16 doubleheader sweep.

For the season, Smith batter .244 with a team leading 62 RBIs. His sixteen home runs were second to rookie Ron Swoboda's nineteen. His glove also improved substantially; he only made eighteen errors at third for a .957 fielding percentage (league average was .951). After the season, he and pitcher Al Jackson were traded to the Cardinals for former National League Most Valuable Players Ken Boyer.

St. Louis Cardinals
Taking over for a Cards legend, Smith homered in his second game as a Cardinal. His one season in St. Louis, he batted a career best .266 with a career best .964 fielding percentage. His performance was good enough to catch the eye of New York Yankees General Manager Lee MacPhail, who traded Roger Maris for Smith in a one-for-one swap on December 8, 1966.

New York Yankees
A little over a week before acquiring Smith, the Yankees traded away  starting third baseman Clete Boyer. The pressure of replacing two stars overwhelmed Smith. He also regressed defensively, committing 21 errors.

The Yankees acquired third baseman Bobby Cox from the Atlanta Braves after the season. Smith became a reserve, making just 77 plate appearances, and received most of his playing time as a pinch hitter. He was 10-for-31 with four RBIs in that role. Overall, he  batted .229. His one home run of the season was a walk off against Wilbur Wood on September 10.

Chicago Cubs
After the season, he was traded to the San Francisco Giants for second baseman Nate Oliver. Toward the end of Spring training, the Giants sold his contract to the Cubs. He appeared in just two games with the Cubs, spending most of his time in the Pacific Coast League with the Tacoma Cubs, however, those two games earned him the distinction of having been the first baseball player to play for both Chicago and both New York franchises.

Career statistics

Private life
Smith made his home in Reno, Nevada, where he made his professional baseball debut at age 19 with the Class C Reno Silver Sox. He and his wife, Carol had two children, a son, Brian, and a daughter, Suzanne. He died suddenly on November 29,  at age 57 after undergoing knee surgery. He is also survived by three brothers and seven grandchildren.

References

External links
, or The Ultimate Mets Database

1937 births
1994 deaths
Baseball players from South Carolina
Chicago Cubs players
Chicago White Sox players
Indianapolis Indians players
Los Angeles Dodgers players
Macon Dodgers players
Major League Baseball third basemen
New York Mets players
New York Yankees players
Sportspeople from Charleston, South Carolina
Philadelphia Phillies players
Reno Silver Sox players
St. Louis Cardinals players
Spokane Indians players
Tacoma Cubs players
Victoria Rosebuds players